The 2008–09 Cupa României was the 71st season of the Romanian football knockout tournament. It began on 30 July 2008 and the final was played on 13 June 2009. CFR Cluj were the defending champions and succeeded in keeping the cup for one more year at Cluj-Napoca.

Round of 32

In this round entered the 14 winners of the Phase V and the 18 teams from the 2008–09 Liga I season.

The matches were played on October 14, 15 and 16, 2008.

|}

Round of 16

The matches were played on 12 November 2008.

|}

Quarter-finals

The matches were played on 14 and 15 April 2009.

Semi-finals

The matches were played on 28 and 29 April 2009.

Final

External links
 Official site 

Cupa Romaniei
Cupa Romaniei 2008-09
Cupa României seasons